Inge Harald Skog (born 22 August 1949) is a Norwegian boxer. He competed in the men's light heavyweight event at the 1972 Summer Olympics.

References

External links
 

1949 births
Living people
Norwegian male boxers
Olympic boxers of Norway
Boxers at the 1972 Summer Olympics
People from Aust-Agder
Light-heavyweight boxers
Sportspeople from Agder
20th-century Norwegian people